Ampelochori (before 1927: Μαρκόβιανη - Markoviani, renamed until 1950: Μαρκοχώρι - Markochori) is a village in Kastoria Regional Unit, Western Macedonia, Greece.

The Greek census (1920) recorded 119 people in the village and in 1923 there were 120 inhabitants (or 15 families) who were Muslim. Following the Greek-Turkish population exchange, in 1926 within Markoviani there were 11 refugee families from Pontus. The Greek census (1928) recorded 135 village inhabitants. There were 11 refugee families (51 people) in 1928.

References

Populated places in Kastoria (regional unit)